Clemons Spur is a bare rock spur next south of Forlidas Ridge in the Dufek Massif, Pensacola Mountains. It was named, at the suggestion of party leader Arthur B. Ford of the United States Geological Survey (USGS), after Samuel D. Clemons, steward, U.S. Navy Squadron VXE-6, with the USGS Pensacola Mountains survey, 1965–66.

References
 

Ridges of Queen Elizabeth Land